David Dzhamaliyevich Ikanovich (born 11 July 1989) is a Russian professional football player.

Club career
He made his Russian Football National League debut for FC Baikal Irkutsk on 11 July 2015 in a game against FC Arsenal Tula.

Personal life
David is the son of former professional football goalkeeper, Dzhamal Ikanovich.

References

External links
 Career summary at sportbox.ru

1989 births
Sportspeople from Vladikavkaz
Living people
Russian footballers
Association football goalkeepers
FC Metallurg Lipetsk players
FC Armavir players
FC Baikal Irkutsk players
FC Chita players
FC Sportakademklub Moscow players